The Ministry of Finance of Mongolia (MOF) is responsible for managing the public finances of Mongolia.

Ministers of Finance

 Gadinbalyn Chagdarjav, 1911- 1915
 Luvsanbaldan, 1915 - 1919
 Gombojavyn Luvsantseveen, 1920 - 1921
 Dambyn Chagdarjav, 13 March 1921 - 17 April 1921
 Darizavyn Losol, 17 April 1921 - 10 July 1921
 Soliin Danzan, 10 July 1921 - 6 April 1923
 Bunibazaryn Dorj, 1923 - 1924
 Ölziin Badrakh, 1924 - 1925
 Jigmediin Altangerel, 1925 - 1926
 Sanjiin Dovchin, 1926 - 1939
 Yumjaagiin Tsedenbal, 1939 - 1940
 Sonomyn Luvsan, 1940 - 1941
 Tserenjavyn Byambaa, 1941 - 1946
 Demchigiin Molomjamts, 1948 - 1957
 Bamdariin Dügersüren, 1957 - 1963
 Dumaagiin Sodnom, 1963 - 1969
 Tsendiin Molom, 1969 - 1979
 Erdeniin Byambajav, 1979 - 1984
 Demchigjavyn Molomjamts, 1984 - 1990
 Ayuurzanyn Bazarkhüü, 1990 - 1992
 Dalrain Davaasambuu, 1992 - 1995
 Puntsagiin Tsagaan, 1996 - 1998
 Bat-Erdeniin Batbayar, 1998 - 1999
 Yansanjavyn Ochirsükh, 1999 - 2000
 Chültemiin Ulaan, 2000 - 2004
 Norovyn Altankhuyag, 2004 - 2006
 Nadmidyn Bayartsaikhan, 2006 - 2007
 Chültemiin Ulaan, 2007 - 2008
 Sangajavyn Bayartsogt, 2008 - 2012
 Chültemiin Ulaan, 2012 - 2014
 Jargaltulgyn Erdenebat, 2014 - 2015
 Bayarbaataryn Bolor, 2015 - 2016
 Battogtokhyn Choijilsüren, 2016 - 2017
 Chimediin Khürelbaatar, 2017 - 2021
 Boldin Javkhlan, 2021 - present

References

Politics of Mongolia
Finance
Mongolia
1924 establishments in Mongolia